Woody Bay, within the Exmoor National Park, is a station on the former Lynton and Barnstaple Railway, a narrow gauge line that ran through Exmoor from Barnstaple to Lynton and Lynmouth in North Devon. The station was situated inland, about 1 1/2 miles from Woody Bay itself.

History

It opened with the line (as Wooda Bay until the name was changed in 1901) on 11 May 1898. The station building was designed by Jones of Lynton in a similar style to Lynton Town Hall.

Woody Bay station was built in part to serve the expected development of a resort at Woody Bay, a mile or so to the north.  A pier was built in the bay, although little further development took place, and the pier was destroyed by heavy seas before any trade could be established with passing steamers, and the development was abandoned when the promoter went into liquidation in 1900, and although a route was surveyed for a branch line to the bay, it was never constructed.

From 1923 the line was operated by the Southern Railway. It closed on 29 September 1935.

Following purchase by the Lynton and Barnstaple Railway Company in 1995, restoration of the station began, and it opened as a Visitors' Centre in 2003.  An "out and back" service over a few hundred yards of track began in 2004, and with the opening of a temporary station at Killington Lane about a mile towards Parracombe Halt, a regular "point to point" service started in 2006.

Several trees have grown in the intervening years, but these two photos, taken over a hundred years apart, are still recognisably from the same location (except being taken from opposite sides of the building and different ranges).  The carriage shed built into the cutting beyond the station is a portable structure erected in 2003.

Woody Bay station is at:

References

Former Lynton and Barnstaple Railway stations
Heritage railway stations in Devon
Railway stations in Great Britain opened in 1898
Railway stations in Great Britain closed in 1935
Railway stations in Great Britain opened in 2004
Exmoor